Diablos Rojos is a Peruvian football club, playing in the city of Juliaca, Peru.

Club was founded in 1965 and plays in Copa Perú, which is the third division of Peruvian league system.

History

In 2008 Copa Perú, club classified to the National stage, but was eliminated by IDUNSA of Arequipa in the quarterfinals.

In 2009 Copa Perú, club again classified to the National stage, but was eliminated by León de Huánuco in the semifinals.

Rivalries
Diablos Rojos has had a long-standing rivalry with Alfonso Ugarte and Unión Carolina.

Honours

Regional
Región VIII: 0
Winners (1): 2008
Runner-up (1): 2009

Liga Departamental de Puno: 1
Winners (1): 2008
Runner-up (1): 2009

Liga Provincial de Juliaca: 0
Runner-up (1): 2014

Liga Superior de Puno: 1
Winners (1): 2008

Liga Distrital de Juliaca: 1
Winners (1): 2014
Runner-up (3): 2015, 2016, 2017

See also
List of football clubs in Peru
Peruvian football league system

Football clubs in Peru
Association football clubs established in 1965